This is a list of the members of the 1st Lebanese parliament. It had 46 members.  30 of them were elected during the 1927 elections and the other 16 were added to body after the abolishment of the Senate.

Members

References

Politics of Lebanon